The Plastics Inventor is a Disney animated short from 1944, produced in Technicolor by RKO Radio Pictures, featuring Donald Duck.

Plot
Donald Duck makes an airplane made of plastic, following instructions from a radio. Problems ensue when during the test flight when Donald learns that the plastic melts when wet and it is destroyed by rain.

Voice cast
Clarence Nash as Donald Duck

Home media
The short was released on December 6, 2005, on Walt Disney Treasures: The Chronological Donald, Volume Two: 1942-1946.

References

External links
 

Donald Duck short films
1944 films
1940s Disney animated short films
1944 animated films
1944 short films
Films directed by Jack King
Films produced by Walt Disney
Animated films about aviation
Films scored by Oliver Wallace
Films with screenplays by Carl Barks